Vitaliy Heorhiyovych Mintenko (born 29 October 1972) is a Ukrainian retired professional footballer.

References

External links
 
 Mintenko at ukr-football.org

1972 births
Living people
People from Storozhynets
Soviet footballers
Ukrainian footballers
Association football midfielders
FC Volyn Lutsk players
FC Bukovyna Chernivtsi players
FC Dynamo Kyiv players
FC Dynamo-2 Kyiv players
Maccabi Ironi Ashdod F.C. players
Maccabi Herzliya F.C. players
FC Spartak Ivano-Frankivsk players
FC Metalurh Donetsk players
FC Metalurh-2 Donetsk players
Hapoel Jerusalem F.C. players
FC Kryvbas Kryvyi Rih players
FC Dnipro players
FC Dnipro-2 Dnipropetrovsk players
FC Metalist Kharkiv players
Soviet Second League players
Ukrainian Premier League players
Ukrainian First League players
Ukrainian Second League players
Liga Leumit players
Israeli Premier League players
Ukrainian expatriate footballers
Expatriate footballers in Israel
Ukrainian expatriate sportspeople in Israel
Sportspeople from Chernivtsi Oblast